Major General Ben Uuyamba Kadhila is a retired Namibian military officer whose last appointment was as Chief Joint Operations of the Namibian Defence Force (NDF). He served as the first Commander of the Namibian Special Forces, he retired in July 2018.

PLAN career 
During the Cuito Cuanavale battles Kadhila was the commander of PLAN'S Tiger battalion attached to FAPLA and Cuban forces. He also served as the Chief of Staff PLAN eighth Battalion

NDF career 
Major General Kadhila was inducted into the NDF in 1990 with the rank of Captain. He progressed through various ranks until being promoted to Colonel and appointed as Senior Staff Officer Current Operations. From 1998 to 2001 he was the First contingent commander of Namibian forces deployed to the DRC under operation Atlantic. In 2005 as a colonel he attended the Kenya National Defence College . After which he joined the Special Forces earning his Parachute jump wings and appointed as Commander Special Forces. He was Promoted to Brigadier General and appointed as Deputy Joint Operations Chief. His last appointment was as Chief of Staff Joint Operations

Retirement
After retirement General Kadhila was appointed as managing director of Windhoeker Maschinenfabrik.

Qualifications 
2005 NDC - Kenya
psc qualification - Zimbabwe

Honours and decorations
  Namibian Army Pioneer Medal.
  NDF Commendation Medal
 Grand Command of the Most Excellent Order of Namibia 2nd Class
  Army Ten Years Medal
  Army Twenty Years Service Medal

Proficiency and Qualification Badges
Parachute Wings(Static line)
Special Forces Operator Badge

References

1958 births
Living people
People's Liberation Army of Namibia personnel
Namibian military personnel